Eucopina is a genus of tortricid moths in the family Tortricidae found in North America. There are about nine described species in Eucopina.

Species
These nine species belong to the genus Eucopina:
 Eucopina bobana (Kearfott, 1907)
 Eucopina cocana (Kearfott, 1907) (shortleaf pinecone borer moth)
 Eucopina gloriola (Heinrich, 1931) (white pine shoot-borer)
 Eucopina monitorana (Heinrich, 1920) (red pinecone borer moth)
 Eucopina ponderosa (Powell, 1968)
 Eucopina rescissoriana (Heinrich, 1920) (lodgepole pinecone borer moth)
 Eucopina siskiyouana (Kearfott, 1907) (fir cone borer)
 Eucopina sonomana (Kearfott, 1907) (western pine shoot borer moth)
 Eucopina tocullionana (Heinrich, 1920) (white pine cone borer)

References

Further reading

 

Olethreutinae